Joseph Ngute's government has governed Cameroon since 2019. It is made up of 63 members, including the Prime Minister, 4 Ministers of State, 31 Ministers, 12 Deputy Ministers, 5 Ministers in charge of mission and 10 Secretaries of State. The government has 8 women members.

Ministers 

 Bello Bouba Maigari - Minister of Tourism and Leisure
 Laurent Esso - Minister of Justice
 Jacques Fame Ndongo - Minister of Higher Education

References 

Government of Cameroon
Cabinets established in 2019
Current governments
2019 establishments in Cameroon